The Hornet (Stršljen) is a 1998 Serbian drama film directed by Gorčin Stojanovic.

Cast 
 Sergej Trifunović – Miljaim
 Mirjana Joković – Adrijana
 Dragan Jovanović – Inspektor Boban Đorđević
 Branimir Popović – Abaz
 Meto Jovanovski – Avdija
 Ljubiša Samardžić – Profesor Lane Šekularac
 Enver Petrovci – Salih
 Mirko Vlahović – Redžepi
 Dragan Petrović – Inspektor Peter Helmer
 Miloš Timotijević – Emin
 Dragan Maksimović – Azem
 Vojin Ćetković – Taxi driver

References

External links 

1998 drama films
1998 films
Films set in Switzerland
Films set in Serbia
Films set in Belgrade
Films set in Kosovo
Albanian-language films
English-language Yugoslav films
1990s Serbian-language films
Yugoslav drama films
Serbian drama films
Films shot in Belgrade
1990s English-language films
1998 multilingual films
Yugoslav multilingual films